Derrel Joe Luce (born September 29, 1952) is a former professional American football linebacker in the National Football League. He played six seasons for the Baltimore Colts, the Minnesota Vikings, and the Detroit Lions.

1952 births
Living people
People from Lake Jackson, Texas
Players of American football from Texas
American football linebackers
Baylor Bears football players
Baltimore Colts players
Minnesota Vikings players
Detroit Lions players